is a 1946 Japanese film written and directed by Akira Kurosawa. It is based on the 1933 Takigawa incident.

The film stars Setsuko Hara, Susumu Fujita, Takashi Shimura and Denjirō Ōkōchi. Fujita's character was inspired by the real-life Hotsumi Ozaki, who assisted the famous Soviet spy Richard Sorge and so became the only Japanese citizen to suffer the death penalty for treason during World War II. The film is in black-and-white and runs 110 minutes.

Plot
The film begins in 1933. Students at Kyoto Imperial University protest the Japanese invasion of Manchuria. Prominent professor Yagihara (Denjiro Okochi) is relieved of his post because of his views against fascism. The professor's daughter Yukie (Setsuko Hara) is courted by two of her father's students: Ryukichi Noge (Susumu Fujita) and Itokawa (Akitake Kôno). Itokawa is equable and moderate while Noge is fiery and a radical leftist. Although she fights with him vigorously, Yukie is eventually drawn toward Noge.

Noge disappears following an anti-militarist student protest, the result of being arrested and spending four years in jail. By the time Itokawa, now a prosecutor for the government, tells Yukie of Noge's whereabouts, he has been out of jail for a year. He warns her that he is a changed man and no longer how Yukie remembered him.

Itokawa brings Noge over to the Yagihara residence. During dinner, Professor Yagihara mentions that Noge would not have been released unless the government was convinced that Noge had "converted" from his radical ways. Noge confirms this and says that Itokawa vouched for him and had even found him a job in the army.

After realizing that Noge has changed from his days at university, Yukie excuses herself from the dinner table and locks herself in her room. Her mother eventually tells her that the young men are leaving. Yukie is reluctant to see them out, but once her mother tells her that Noge is leaving for China she decides to see Noge one last time to say goodbye.

After Noge's departure, Yukie begins to pack for Tokyo and has a deep conversation with her father. For three years in Tokyo, Yukie works in menial jobs to get by. One day she runs into Itokawa and is told that Noge is in the city. She goes to Noge's offices, but is reluctant to reconnect. Yukie is shown outside of the offices several times until eventually Noge notices her. They spend several years together and get married.

Yukie discovers that Noge is involved in dangerous and illegal activities, but they agree that she should not know exactly what they are. Noge is arrested the night before his plans are to go into effect. Yukie is interrogated, but she proffers no information. She is treated badly during the interrogations but Itokawa is eventually able to free her.

Her parents take the train into Tokyo where Yukie's father meets up with Itokawa, thanks him for what he has done and informs him that he intends to represent Noge in court. Itokawa mournfully responds that Noge died the night before. Yukie is crushed. She brings his ashes to his parents, farmers in the countryside, and tells them she is his wife. Noge's father rejects her, believing that she has come to mock them because their son was convicted of being a spy but Yukie stays and works the rice fields with them. They are scorned and harassed in their village, and Yukie tries to convince them of her sincerity and that their son was a good man. The work in the rice fields is hard on her, but she is determined to prove her mettle, even to the point of working through a severe fever.

The night that Yukie and her mother-in-law finally finish planting all of the fields, the neighbors sneak in and destroy their work. When Yukie mourns the vandalism, Noge's father finally accepts her and his son is redeemed in his eyes. At the end of the war, Professor Yagihara is reinstated and Noge is honored for his anti-war efforts. Yukie returns to Kyoto to visit her parents. Yukie's mother invites her to stay since it seems her daughter has achieved her goal: Noge's parents are no longer ashamed of their son. However, Yukie now feels more comfortable planting rice than playing the piano and sees the value in the social work that still must be done in the village (obliquely referencing occupation-era reforms like land reform and women's enfranchisement), so she returns to Noge's parents.

Cast

Reissues
The Criterion Collection has released No Regrets for Our Youth on DVD in North America as part of two Kurosawa-centered box sets; 2008's Postwar Kurosawa, the seventh entry in their Eclipse series, and 2009's AK 100: 25 Films by Akira Kurosawa.

References

External links

No Regrets for Our Youth overview at Rotten Tomatoes
 No Regrets for Our Youth  at the Japanese Movie Database

1946 films
Films directed by Akira Kurosawa
1940s Japanese-language films
Japanese black-and-white films
Films set in 1933
Films set in 1938
Films set in 1941
Films set in 1945
Films set in Tokyo
Films set in Kyoto
Toho films
Films with screenplays by Akira Kurosawa
Japanese drama films
1946 drama films
Films set in universities and colleges